Vogel Ski Resort is a Slovenian ski resort located above Bohinj next to Lake Bohinj. The nearest city is Bled. Ljubljana is about an hour away. The resort was opened in 1964. The ski resort is located on the outskirts of Triglav National Park, therefore all snowmaking activities are forbidden on the area. The ski resort is named after nearby Mount Vogel.

History
First cargo funifor started operating in 1961, but it was broken down because of the lightning strike. In 1964 the passenger funifor was built with capacity of 15 passengers. In the fall of 1964 also the first surface lift Križ started operating. In the following 3 years new chairlifts were built and in the 1970s they began to build the new Ski Hotel and other gastronomy services. The latest modernisation of the ski resort happened in 2000s, when the funifor was replaced by the new Poma's (2001) and two fourchairs were delivered by Doppelmayr in 2007.

Accommodation
Accommodation capabilities are available directly on the Ski Resort in a Ski Hotel (most likely will be reopened in the winter 2013/2014) or in the town of Bohinj.

Major hotels in the vicinity:
 Ski Hotel (Right on the Ski Resort)
 Bohinj Park Eco Hotel
 Hotel Bohinj
 Hotel Jezero
 Hotel Kristal
 Hotel Center Bohinjsko Jezero

Ski lifts

Ski slopes

Snow Park
A lot of competitions and other activities have occurred for many years at Vogel Snow Park.

Structures in the snow park
 Box, 3 m and 6 m
 C-box
 Picnic table
 Barrel
 Info point Container
 Roller, 8–10 m
 Mini kicker, 3–4 m
 Rainbow, 6 m
 Mini rainbow
 Downrail, 4,5 m and 5,3 m and 9 m 
 Double wave, 9 m 
 Big air, 14–16 m
 Big air, 10–12 m
 Double king, 10 m
 King box, 7 m

Snow school and equipment rental 
Finžgar and Alpinsport provide convenient ski coaching and equipment rental services at Vogel Ski Resort. The ski schools provide private coaches for all levels of skiers and snowboarders.

Gallery

External links
 vogel.si - official site

Ski areas and resorts in Slovenia